John W. Salevurakis is a tenured associate professor of economics at the American University in Cairo and the author of several academic articles, monographs, book chapters, and popular press articles focusing upon the political economy of food security, environmental conservation, and economic development.

Biography and education

John Salevurakis was born in Tacoma, Washington, in 1971. He was raised and educated in Salt Lake City, Utah, and currently resides in Cairo, Egypt. Salevurakis studied economics at Westminster College in Salt Lake City, Utah earning a B.A. in economics in 1993 and an M.B.A. in 1996.  He was awarded his Ph.D. in 2003 from the University of Utah, where he had studied labor economics, political economy, and the history of economic thought.  As a student in the heterodox economics department at the University of Utah, Salevurakis became primarily interested in labor market failures and the poverty issues that might follow those failures. Having studied these topics from a variety of perspectives, Salevurakis still embraces a variety of ideologies when researching today.

Work

Salevurakis currently lives in Cairo and teaches economics at the American University in Cairo, where he is an associate professor.  He teaches courses in the history of economic thought as well as many courses relating to economic development.  He is concerned primarily with issues of poverty and food security in the developing world but also researches the ability that markets may have to ensure environmental conservation.  Salevurakis has also published critical essays relating to Egyptian and American political economy and has recently explored the degree to which Islamic finance principles might provide a degree of "useful friction" for modern financial markets.

Publications

Refereed journals – articles

Salevurakis, John William and Tarek Selim. “Cultural Development and Social Resistance to Change", in Development, Forthcoming.

Salevurakis, John William, Tamer ElGindi, and Mona Said. “Islamic Alternatives to Purely Capitalist Modes of Finance: A Study of Malaysian Banks from 1999 to 2006”, in Review of Radical Political Economics, Vol. 41, No. 4, (2009).

Salevurakis, John William and Sahar Mohamed Abdel-Haleim. “Bread Subsidies in Egypt: Choosing Social Stability or Fiscal Responsibility”, in Review of Radical Political Economics, Vol. 40, No. 1, 35-49, (2008).

Refereed Journals – Book Reviews

Salevurakis, John William. Review of  John Weiss and Haider A Khan.  “Poverty Strategies in Asia: A Growth Plus Approach”,  in The Journal of Contemporary Asia, Vol. 38, No. 4, 648-673, (2008).

Salevurakis, John William.  Review of Sujian Guo.  “The Political Economy of Asian Transition Economies”, in The Journal of Contemporary Asia, Vol. 38, No. 2, 330-352, (2008).

Salevurakis, John William. Review of Anna M. Agathangelou's  “The Political Economy of Sex”, in Review of Radical Political Economics, Vol. 40, No. 3,  408-410, (2008).
	
Books/Monographs

Salevurakis, John William and Garth Mangum. Toward a Second Chance for the  Disadvantaged Among Utah's  Workforce: A Response to the Workforce Investment Act of 1998,  Salt Lake City: Consortium on Employment Development,  November 2000.

Salevurakis, John William and Garth Mangum. Welfare Reform Initiative:  The Impact of Welfare Reform on the Charitable Efforts of  the Salt Lake Valley Faith Community,  University of Utah, Center for Public Policy and Administration, October 2000.

Book Chapters

Salevurakis,  John William. “Wildlife Conservation : A Case Study of Endangered Species in Egypt”, in Egypt, Energy and the Environment: Critical Sustainability Perspectives, Tarek Selim ed., Great Britain: Adonis & Abbey Publishers Ltd, pp. 173–186, July 2009

Publications in Edited Outlets

Salevurakis, John William. “The ‘China Syndrome’: An Apology for Economic Injustice”, Monthly Review, May 13, 2008.

Salevurakis, John William. “Aish Baladi vs. Pizza Hut”, Monthly Review, April 6, 2008.

Salevurakis, John William. “Bush Revives Pan-Arabism…by Accident or Design?”, Monthly Review, July 23, 2006.

Salevurakis, John William. “Darkness on the Edge of Cairo”, Monthly Review, July 8, 2006.

Conference Proceedings

Salevurakis,  John William, Abigail Johnson and Karl Rich.  “Coasian Bargaining and the Sustainable Management of Endangered Species: Case Studies and Broader Lessons for Livestock Disease Management”, International Society for Veterinary Epidemiology and Economics,  2009.

Salevurakis, John William, Mona Said and Jackline Wahba.  “Employment, Job Quality, and Wages in Egypt and Morocco: As Determined by Openness to International Trade and Educational Attainment”, FEMISE, 2009.

Media exposure 

Reuters interview about food security
The Guardian interview about food security
German television interview
A Norwegian news agency interview
The Daily News Egypt interview about illegal immigration
The Daily News Egypt interview about environmental conservation
Daily News Egypt interview about subsidies

References

External links 

Profile of John W. Salevurakis at the American University in Cairo Web site
The American University in Cairo Development Studies web-site
Monthly Review Article - Darkness on the Edge of Cairo
Monthly Review Article - Aish Baladi vs. Pizza Hut
Monthly Review Article - The China Syndrome: An Apology for Economic Injustice
A monograph exploring welfare reform
An Islamic finance journal article co-authored by John W. Salevurakis
A bread subsidies journal article co-authored by John W. Salevurakis

21st-century American economists
Labor economists
1971 births
Living people
Westminster College (Utah) alumni
University of Utah alumni
Academic staff of The American University in Cairo